Belite Orli Pleven  is a Bulgarian football club from the town of Pleven, currently playing in the A RFG Pleven, the fourth division of Bulgarian football. The team was dissolved in 2010, but was restored in 2014.

History

Foundation
On 19 August 1931 in Pleven is founded the football club Belite Orleta. The team name is changed to Belite Orli in 1932. In 1942 they are allowed to build own stadium called Spartak, but later the name is changed to Belite Orli Stadium. In 1947 team is merged with the other Pleven football clubs to found one united team called PFC Spartak Pleven.

1991–2010
On 20 January 1991 the team is refounded by Viktor Haidukov, son of one of the original founders and others. Team is led by association Sport Club Belite Orli. The team had 8 seasons in the Bulgarian 2nd league B Group, before it was dissolved in 2010 due to financial problems.

2014–present
The team is ones again refounded in 2014 and started from the fifth league of Bulgaria the B Regional Group. The team promoted to A Regional Group in the first season. For the 2014–15 season Svetoslav Barkanichkov was appointed as manager hoping to manage the team to the V Group.

Honours
B RFG Pleven:
 Winners (1): 2014–15

Players

Managers

Past seasons

External links
 Български клубове – Белите орли (Плевен)
 Белите орли (Плевен)

Belite orli
1931 establishments in Bulgaria
2010 disestablishments in Bulgaria
2014 establishments in Bulgaria
Pleven